Events from the year 1614 in Sweden

Incumbents
 Monarch – Gustaf II Adolf

Events

 - Armistice with Poland. 
 - Svea Court of Appeal
 - Alliance with the Netherlands. 
 - Battle of Bronnicy.
 - Swedish occupation of Gdov.

Births

 Gustaf Otto Stenbock, soldier and politician (died 1685) 
 Bengt Skytte, courtier and diplomat
 Elin Såger, businessperson

Deaths

 Ebba Stenbock

References

 
Years of the 17th century in Sweden
Sweden